In the Indian subcontinent, mannat is a wish that one desires to come to fruition and the vow one makes to a deity or saint after his/her wish comes true. 

The word comes from the Persian language in which mannat (منّت), means "grace, favour, or praise". The word was first used at dargahs, Sufi Islamic shrines of deceased fakirs.

South Asians often make pilgrimages to houses of worship that are associated with the fulfillment of one's mannat; while these sites have a certain religious affiliation, people of all faiths visit them, reflecting a historical composite culture of the Indian subcontinent. Devotees make a promise to do a good work for God when their mannat is fulfilled, such as distributing sweets at the house of worship, giving alms to feed the poor, and resolving to pray every day. Examples of mannat asked for at various religious sites include childless couples praying for a baby, women praying for their husbands to find a good job, etc.

Sites frequented for Mannat 
Ajmer Sharif Dargah in India
Basilica of Our Lady of the Mount, Bandra in Bombay (Mumbai), India.
Imambaras of Lucknow, India
Pakka Pul Pir in India
Shrine of Baba Farid in Pakistan.
Siddhivinayak Temple, Mumbai, India.

See also
Sacred gardens
Lourdes Grotto

References 

Indian culture
Pakistani culture
Hindi words and phrases
Urdu-language words and phrases